The boys' doubles tournament of the 2019 Badminton Asia Junior Championships will be held from 24 to 28 July. Di Zijian / Wang Chang from China clinched this title in the last edition.

Seeds
Seeds were announced on 2 July.

 Di Zijian / Wang Chang (final)
 Leo Rolly Carnando / Daniel Marthin (champions)
 Dai Enyi / Feng Yanzhe (semifinals)
 Thanawin Madee / Ratchapol Makkasasithorn (third round)
 Tanadon Punpanich / Sirawit Sothon (second round)
 Wei Chun-wei / Wu Guan-xun (second round)
 Ki Dong-ju / Kim Joon-young (quarterfinals)
 Jiang Zhenbang / Liang Yongwang (third round)

Draw

Finals

Top half

Section 1

Section 2

Bottom half

Section 3

Section 4

References

External links 
Main Draw

2019 Badminton Asia Junior Championships